General Sir Samuel James Browne,  (3 October 1824 – 14 March 1901) was a British Indian Army cavalry officer, known best as the creator of the Sam Browne belt. He was a recipient of the Victoria Cross, the most prestigious award for gallantry in combat that can be awarded to British and Commonwealth forces.

Early life 
He was born in Barrackpore, India, the son of Dr. John Browne, a surgeon of the Bengal Medical Service and his wife Charlotte (née Swinton). Educated in England, Browne returned to India in 1840 and joined the 46th Bengal Native Infantry as an ensign. During the Second Anglo-Sikh War, he participated in actions at Ramnuggar, Sadulpur, Chillianwalla and Gujrat. In 1849 he was made a lieutenant and tasked with raising a cavalry force, to be designated the 2nd Punjab Irregular Cavalry and later incorporated into the regular force. From 1851 to 1863 he was adjutant and then commanding officer of this unit. Later (1904) the unit would be re-designated as the 22nd Sam Browne's Cavalry (Frontier Force) in his honour.

Indian Mutiny 
Browne commanded the 2nd Punjab in several engagements, and was decorated for action during the Bozdar Expedition of 1857, being promoted to captain.

Browne was awarded the Victoria Cross for actions on 31 August 1858 at Seerporah, Rohilkhand, Uttar Pradesh, India. His citation reads:

His Victoria Cross is displayed at the National Army Museum.

Sam Browne belt 

Sometime after this incident he began to wear the accoutrement which now bears his name, as compensation for the difficulty his disability caused with wearing his officer's sword. A Sam Browne belt is a wide belt, usually leather, supported by a narrower strap passing diagonally over the right shoulder; the diagonal strap stabilizes the scabbard of a sword if worn. Later such a belt would be adopted by other officers who knew Browne in India, but it was not to become used commonly by the British Army until after his retirement. Browne's original "Sam Browne" belt is possessed presently by the National Army Museum in Chelsea.

Later career and retirement 
After the Indian Mutiny, Browne remained in the Indian Army and was promoted major-general in February 1870. In 1876 he was made a Knight Commander of the Order of the Star of India (KCSI), and became a lieutenant-general on 1 October 1877.

During the Second Anglo-Afghan War in 1878–9, Browne commanded the Peshawar Valley Field Force. After entering Afghanistan via the Khyber Pass, and defeating the Afghan army at the battle of Ali Masjid on 21 November 1878, he occupied Jalalabad on 20 December. However, further advance towards Kabul in the new year was slowed by transport difficulties. After the end of the first phase of the war in May 1879, Browne's force returned to India. Although criticised by the viceroy Lord Lytton for the slow pace of his advance, Browne was made a Knight Commander of the Order of the Bath (KCB) and received the thanks of both Parliament and the government of India for his Afghan service. He retired from active service in 1884, was promoted general on 1 December 1888 and made a Knight Grand Cross of the Order of the Bath (GCB) in 1891.

In retirement Browne lived in Ryde on the Isle of Wight, England, and died there in 1901 at the age of 76. His remains were cremated but there is a memorial marker dedicated to Browne in the Ryde New Cemetery, as well as plaques at St Paul's Cathedral in London and Lahore Cathedral in Pakistan. His grave was restored in 2010.

References

External links 
 

1824 births
1901 deaths
19th-century British inventors
People from Alnwick
Military personnel from Northumberland
British amputees
British Indian Army generals
Indian Rebellion of 1857 recipients of the Victoria Cross
British East India Company Army officers
British military personnel of the Second Anglo-Afghan War
British military personnel of the Second Anglo-Sikh War
British recipients of the Victoria Cross
Knights Commander of the Order of the Star of India
Knights Grand Cross of the Order of the Bath
Military personnel of British India